Tumasi Quissa (born in 1948 at a camp near Akulivik, Quebec, Canada) is an Inuit singer-songwriter and a carver. Tumasi and his brother performed a few songs live on Canadian national television as part of 1981's Canada Day celebrations, and they were such a hit that CBC Northern Service Broadcast Recordings decided to issue a whole LP of their material entitled Better Times (De Meilleurs Jours).

References

External links
WFMU's Beware of the Blog: She Be She Strike

1948 births
Living people
Canadian country singer-songwriters
Canadian folk singers
Inuit from Quebec
Canadian male singer-songwriters
Inuit musicians
20th-century Canadian male singers
People from Nunavik